Jaane Bhi Do Yaaron is a 2007 Bollywood comedy film.

Plot
Raja can be best described as a grown-up version of "Dennis the menace" and all neighbors, professors, principal and even his father, who is incidentally a police commissioner is not spared by his mischievous pranks. His father hatches a plan to teach him a lesson. He somehow convinces Raja to go his uncle's house in Dehra Doon for a holiday. His uncle is a no nonsense strict disciplinarian military man and probably the only person, who can instill some discipline and focus in the wavered life and attitude of Raja.
Nisha played by Kulraj Randhawa is a smart con girl, who has not only stolen diamonds worth Rs.100 crores ($25 million) from an exhibition but, has also double-crossed the boss of the most notorious gang. Now, she is on the run with the diamonds.
Destiny gets Raja and Nisha to meet in the most unexpected and bizarre circumstance. So when the smartest con girl and the biggest prankster meet, lots of fireworks are inevitable.
They become part of the journey which is a long roller coaster ride full of hilarious moments to death defying stunts and events.  And a cat and a mouse game kicks-off where a couple of gangs, dacoits and police all are on their hot trail.
In all this mayhem and confusion, how do these two reach their destination and fulfill their dream and how the love blossoms between them forms crux of the story.

Cast 
 Kulraj Randhawa aa Nisha
 Kapil Sharma as Raja
 Anupam Kher as Lama
 Dilip Joshi as Lalwani
 Vijay Raaz as Gangu Bhai
 Govind Namdev as Guladeen
 Dinesh Hingoo as Pyarelal
 Rajesh Vivek as Pandit Kishore
 Makarand Deshpande as Jojo 
 Sneha Ullal in Special appearance

References

External links 
 Jaane Bhi Do Yaaron at MovieTalkies.com
 Movie Preview: Jaane Bhi Do Yaaron (2007)
 

2007 films
2000s Hindi-language films
Films scored by Bappi Lahiri